Mario and Donkey Kong: Minis on the Move, known in Japan as , is a puzzle video game for the Nintendo 3DS and is the fifth game in the Mario vs. Donkey Kong series. It was released exclusively via the Nintendo eShop download service on May 9, 2013, in the PAL region and North America and July 24 in Japan.

Gameplay

In the main game, the player must place blocks on a grid with the goal of making a path for a Mini—a small walking robot resembling Mario or another Mario series character—to travel from a warp pipe to a star goal, while avoiding obstacles such as spike pits and Shy Guys along the way. The player can complete the additional task of collecting three colored coins along the created path, which itself may require additional tasks, such as closing the Mini within a figure-eight loop. Players can tap the mini, which gives it a burst of speed. If the mini falls off the pathway, gets blocked, stays in the pipe after about 30 seconds, if too many pieces fill the pipe, or if the timer reaches zero, the player fails the level. Collecting all three coins for a level earns the player a star token, which unlock additional gameplay modes, levels, and toys as they are amassed. There are more than 180 puzzles over four modes of play, as well as four minigames which can be unlocked.

Additionally, Minis on the Move features a level creation mode with which the player can create custom levels using any and all pieces from the main game, as well as control the frequency of available falling tiles. Created levels can be saved and shared via StreetPass once the player is able to complete the created level. These levels can also be shared via Nintendo Network, where users can download other popular user creations.

Development
Like the 4 previous entries in the Mario vs. Donkey Kong series, Minis on the Move was developed by Nintendo Software Technology.

Reception

Minis on the Move received "generally favorable reviews" according to the review aggregation website Metacritic. Most reviews cite the level creator as the most impressive element of the game. IGNs Lucas M. Thomas wrote that it's "a feature that should extend the [replay value] significantly," though some (including Thomas) derided the limitation of randomly falling pieces in creating levels.

GamesMaster called the game "A breezy, if surprisingly brutal, puzzler that puts full 3DS retail releases to shame." Tony Ponce of Destructoid appreciated the removal of "the needless threadbare plot of [Mario vs. Donkey Kong] games past." Of the revised gameplay, he wrote he was "glad Nintendo decided to explore new avenues for the Minis," having a decidedly favorable reaction to Minis on the Move taking inspiration from Lemmings and "railroad puzzles." Tom Sykes of Official Nintendo Magazine wrote that "it's clear that Nintendo has gone above and beyond the call of duty, particularly for a £9 [] downloadable title." He suggests that both Pipe Mania and Tetris were positive inspirations for the gameplay in Minis on the Move, culminating in a "compelling, cleverly realised and challenging set of wind-up puzzles."

Lucas M. Thomas was less favorable towards what he wrote is "simply a Nintendo-fied version of the old-school puzzler Pipe Mania." While derisive of the main game's "randomized tile dispenser," Thomas found the "Puzzle Palace" and "Many Minis Mayhem" modes to be "the highlight of the package." Nintendo Lifes Jon Wahlgren found that "every trick in the book is deployed" to create a "constant sense of urgency" with gameplay that is "a little unfair at times." He deemed "the secret best part" of Minis on the Move to be the minigame "Cube Crash," comparing it to Art Style: Cubello, but overall feeling it was a game that "doesn’t really justify the move into 3D". Mike Suszek of Joystiq also compared the game to Pipe Mania, though "much more fleshed-out," while calling the minigames simply a "reason to look away from the touch screen." Suszek stated in summation that the "challenge never materializes."

Chad Sapieha of National Post gave it a score of eight out of ten and said, "A little game like Mario and Donkey [Kong]: Minis on the Move would make a perfect test title for the broader mobile market. I’d be shocked if it didn’t rocket to the top of app sales charts." Liam Martin of Digital Spy also gave it four stars out of five, saying that "Despite a few minor complaints, largely concerning the bonus content, Mario and Donkey Kong: Minis on the Move is an abundant, accessible and entertaining puzzle game that combines Nintendo craftsmanship with a competitive price tag." David Jenkins of Metro similarly gave it a score of eight out of ten, calling it "A welcome change of style for the puzzle series, and although its influences are obvious this offers impressive value and variety for an eShop download."

References

External links
 Official website
 

2013 video games
Nintendo 3DS eShop games
Nintendo 3DS-only games
Nintendo Network games
Nintendo Software Technology games
Video game sequels
Nintendo 3DS games
Video games about toys
Video games developed in the United States
Mario vs. Donkey Kong
Video games scored by James Phillipsen
Video games produced by Kensuke Tanabe
Single-player video games